Cristina Gallach (born 1960) is a Spanish journalist and former European Union and United Nations official. She was the 14th Secretary of State for Foreign Affairs and for Ibero-America and the Caribbean of the Spanish government from 2020 to 2021. She serves as High Commissioner for Spain's New language economy strategic project since Feb 2022. She is a member of the Socialists' Party of Catalonia (PSC).

She is the only Spanish woman who has served in high rank positions both in EU, NATO and UN organizations.

Early life
Cristina Gallach was born in 1960 in Spain. She obtained an licentiate degree in "Sciences of Information" (Journalism) from the Autonomous University of Barcelona in 1982. She earned a master's degree in International Affairs from New York's Columbia University in 1986, after being granted a Fulbright Scholarship.

Career
Gallach worked as a journalist for the publication El 9 Nou, El Periódico, EFE, Avui and TVE in Barcelona.

Gallach has extensive experience in the field of communications. She has held several high-level positions and has worked as an aide to Javier Solana for 14 years during the latter's tenures as spokesperson for the Spanish Government, Secretary-General of NATO, Secretary-General of the European Union and thereafter as Secretary-General of both the European Union and Western European Union. When Gallach first met Javier Solana in the early 90’s, she was based in Russia as the Foreign Correspondent for the Spanish News Agency (EFE) covering the last years of the Perestroika. 

Gallach was with the Council of the European Union as Head of the Public Relations Unit in the Directorate-General for Information and Communication. 

Gallach, Wonder Woman actresses Gal Gadot and Lynda Carter, Wonder Woman director Patty Jenkins, and DC Entertainment President Diane Nelson appeared at the United Nations on October 21, 2016, the 75th anniversary of the first appearance of Wonder Woman, to mark the character's designation by the United Nations as its "Honorary Ambassador for the Empowerment of Women and Girls". The gesture was intended to raise awareness of UN Sustainable Development Goal No. 5, which seeks to achieve gender equality and empower all women and girls by 2030. The decision was met with protests from UN staff members who stated in their petition to UN Secretary-General Ban Ki-moon that the character is "not culturally encompassing or sensitive", and served to objectify women. As a result, the character was stripped of the designation, and the project ended December 16.

In July 2018, she was appointed High Commissioner for the 2030 Agenda of Spain, a new office created this year to coordinate the actions of the Government to accomplish with the UN Sustainable Development Goals. She left the office in January 2020, when she was appointed as the 14th Secretary of State for Foreign Affairs. In July 2021, new Foreign Minister José Manuel Albares replaced her with Ángeles Moreno Bau.

References

External links

1960 births
Living people
Spanish officials of the United Nations
Fulbright alumni